Hills of Kentucky is a 1927 American silent drama film directed by Howard Bretherton and written by Edward Clark. The film stars Rin Tin Tin, Jason Robards, Sr., Dorothy Dwan, and features Tom Santschi and Billy Kent Schaefer. It was released by Warner Bros. on February 19, 1927.

Cast
Rin Tin Tin as The Grey Ghost
Jason Robards, Sr. as Steve Harley 
Dorothy Dwan as Janet
Tom Santschi as Ben Harley
Billy Kent Schaefer as Crippled boy
Nanette as herself
Rin-Tin-Tin, Jr. as a puppy

Box office
According to Warner Bros records the film earned $239,000 domestically and $96,000 foreign.

See also
List of early Warner Bros. sound and talking features

Preservation status
Prints are held, incomplete and abridged, at George Eastman House Motion Picture Collection and UCLA Film and Television Archive. A 16mm copy is housed at the Wisconsin Center for Film & Theater Research.

References

External links
 

1927 films
1920s English-language films
Warner Bros. films
American silent feature films
Silent American drama films
1927 drama films
Films directed by Howard Bretherton
American black-and-white films
Rin Tin Tin
1920s American films